Søndre Folgefonna is the third largest glacier in mainland Norway, and is the largest of the three glaciers constituting Folgefonna. The glacier is located at the base of the Folgefonna peninsula in Vestland county in the border of the municipalities of Ullensvang, Etne, and Kvinnherad. The glacier is located inside Folgefonna National Park.

See also
List of glaciers in Norway

References

Glaciers of Vestland
Ullensvang
Etne
Kvinnherad